The bouquet garni (French for "garnished bouquet") is a bundle of herbs usually tied with string and mainly used to prepare soup, stock, casseroles and various stews. The bouquet is cooked with the other ingredients and removed prior to consumption. Liquid remaining in the bouquet garni can be wrung out into the dish.

There is no standard recipe for bouquet garni, but most French recipes include thyme, bay leaf and parsley. It may also include basil, burnet, chervil, rosemary, peppercorns, savory and tarragon. Vegetables such as carrot, celery (leaves or leaf stalks), celeriac, leek, onion and parsley root are sometimes included in the bouquet. In Provence, dried orange peel may be added.

Sometimes, the bouquet is not bound with string, and its ingredients are filled into a small sachet, a piece of celery stalk, a net, or a tea strainer instead. Traditionally, the aromatics are bound within leek leaves, though a cheesecloth, muslin or coffee filter tied with butcher twine can be used.

Use in dishes
Dishes made with a bouquet garni include:
 Boeuf bourguignon
 Blanquette de veau
 Bouillabaisse
 Brown Windsor soup
 Carbonnade flamande
 Cassoulet
 Coq au vin
 Court-bouillon
 French onion soup
 Lapin chasseur (huntsman's rabbit)
 Ossobuco
 Pot-au-feu
 Poule au pot
 ''Tripes à la mode de Caen

References

Bibliography 
 The New Larousse Gastronomique, Crown Publishers, Inc., NY, NY , p. 141

Herb and spice mixtures
French cuisine